Benedito de Ulhôa Vieira, (October 9, 1920 – August 3, 2014) was a Brazilian prelate of the Roman Catholic Church.

Vieira was born in Mococa, Brazil and ordained a priest on December 8, 1948.  Vieira was appointed auxiliary bishop of the Archdiocese of São Paulo as well as titular bishop of Bitettumon November 29, 1971 and was ordained bishop on January 25, 1972. Vieira was appointed archbishop of the Archdiocese of Uberaba on July 14, 1978, where he served until his retirement on February 28, 1996.

External links
Catholic-Hierarchy
Archdiocese of São Paulo 

20th-century Roman Catholic archbishops in Brazil
1920 births
2014 deaths
Roman Catholic archbishops of Uberaba
Roman Catholic bishops of São Paulo